Capricia is a yawl, active as a sail training vessel for the Italian Navy

History
The Bermudian yawl Capricia was built by Bengt Plym shipyard in Sweden, on a project by Sparkman & Stephens New York City (United States) (number 1645), the world-famous yacht design firm.

The vessel is entirely made of wood: white oak for the structure, mahogany for the planking, teak for the deck, Canadian spruce for the masts.

The original owner was Einar Hansen, Malmö, Sweden.

Capricia has a copal-varnished hull and brick red sails that make her instantly recognisable.
Having won the Fastnet in 1965, she was purchased by Fiat boss Gianni Agnelli who held on to her until 1993 when he donated her to the Italian Navy.

The Agnelli family bought it in 1971 and the boat went through a thorough renovation of the interior, which included the creation of an unusual bathroom with a large bathtub.
The latter used Capricia as a training vessel, with cadets from the Italian Naval Academy in Livorno spending regular periods aboard.
Each year she embarks on a training cruise which often includes calls to various classic sailing rallies and regattas.

References

External links
 Capricia Marina Militare website
 

Ships built in Sweden
Training ships of the Italian Navy
1963 ships
Sail training
Tall ships of Italy
Yawls